The traditional Chinese lunisolar calendar divides a year into 24 solar terms. Qiūfēn, Shūbun, Chubun, or Thu phân is the 16th solar term. It begins when the Sun reaches the celestial longitude of 180° and ends when it reaches the longitude of 195°. It more often refers in particular to the day when the Sun is exactly at the celestial longitude of 180°. In the Gregorian calendar, it usually begins around September 23 and ends around October 8.

Pentads

雷始收聲, 'Thunder begins to soften'
蟄蟲培戶, 'Insects make nests'
水始涸, 'Water begins to solidify'

Date and time

See also
 Equinox

References

Autumn
16